Mobile radio telephone systems were mobile telephony systems that preceded modern cellular network technology. Since they were the predecessors of the first generation of cellular telephones, these systems are sometimes retroactively referred to as pre-cellular (or sometimes zero generation, that is, 0G) systems. Technologies used in pre-cellular systems included the Push to Talk (PTT or manual), Mobile Telephone Service (MTS), Improved Mobile Telephone Service (IMTS), and Advanced Mobile Telephone System (AMTS) systems.
These early mobile telephone systems can be distinguished from earlier closed radiotelephone systems in that they were available as a commercial service that was part of the public switched telephone network, with their own telephone numbers, rather than part of a closed network such as a police radio or taxi dispatching system.

These mobile telephones were usually mounted in cars or trucks (thus called car phones), although portable briefcase models were also made. Typically, the transceiver (transmitter-receiver) was mounted in the vehicle trunk and attached to the "head" (dial, display, and handset) mounted near the driver seat.

They were sold through WCCs (Wireline Common Carriers, a.k.a. telephone companies), RCCs (Radio Common Carriers), and two-way radio dealers.

Origins 
Early examples for this technology:
Motorola, in conjunction with the Bell System, operated the first commercial mobile telephone service (MTS) in the US in 1946, as a service of the wireline telephone company. 
The A-Netz launched 1952 in West Germany as the country's first public commercial mobile phone network. 
 System 1 launch in 1959 in the United Kingdom, the 'Post Office South Lancashire Radiophone Service', covering South Lancashire and operated from a telephone exchange in Manchester is cited as the country's first mobile phone network. However it was manual (needed to be connected via an operator) and with very little coverage for several decades.
First automatic system was the Bell System's IMTS which became available in 1964, offering automatic dialing to and from the mobile.
"Altai" mobile telephone system was launched into the experimental service in 1963 in the Soviet Union, becoming fully operational in 1965, a first automatic mobile phone system in Europe.
Televerket opened its first manual mobile telephone system in Norway in 1966. Norway was later the first country in Europe to get an automatic mobile telephone system.
The Autoradiopuhelin (ARP) launched in 1971 in Finland as the country's first public commercial mobile phone network
The Automatizovaný městský radiotelefon (AMR) launched in 1978, fully operational in 1983, in Czechoslovakia as the first analog mobile radio telephone in the whole Eastern Bloc
The B-Netz launched 1972 in West Germany as the country's second public commercial mobile phone network (albeit the first one that did not require human operators to connect calls)

Radio Common Carrier 
Parallel to Improved Mobile Telephone Service (IMTS) in the US until the rollout of cellular AMPS systems, a competing mobile telephone technology was called Radio Common Carrier (RCC). The service was provided from the 1960s until the 1980s when cellular AMPS systems made RCC equipment obsolete. These systems operated in a regulated environment in competition with the Bell System's MTS and IMTS. RCCs handled telephone calls and were operated by private companies and individuals. Some systems were designed to allow customers of adjacent RCCs to use their facilities but the universe of RCCs did not comply with any single interoperable technical standard (a capability called roaming in modern systems). For example, the phone of an Omaha, Nebraska-based RCC service would not be likely to work in Phoenix, Arizona. At the end of RCC's existence, industry associations were working on a technical standard that would potentially have allowed roaming, and some mobile users had multiple decoders to enable operation with more than one of the common signaling formats (600/1500, 2805, and Reach). Manual operation was often a fallback for RCC roamers.

Roaming was not encouraged, in part because there was no centralized industry billing database for RCCs. Signaling formats were not standardized. For example, some systems used two-tone sequential paging to alert a mobile or handheld that a wired phone was trying to call them. Other systems used DTMF. Some used a system called Secode 2805 which transmitted an interrupted 2805 Hz tone (in a manner similar to IMTS signaling) to alert mobiles of an offered call. Some radio equipment used with RCC systems was half-duplex, push-to-talk equipment such as Motorola hand-helds or RCA 700-series conventional two-way radios. Other vehicular equipment had telephone handsets, rotary or push-button dialing, and operated full duplex like a conventional wired telephone. A few users had full-duplex briefcase telephones (which were radically advanced for their day).

RCCs used paired UHF 454/459 MHz and VHF 152/158 MHz frequencies near those used by IMTS.

See also 
 Walkie-talkie
 List of mobile phone generations
 1G
 2G
 3G
 4G
 5G
 Mobile rig
 Mobile Telephone Service - (A pre-cellular VHF radio system that linked to the PSTN)
 Radiotelephone -  (A communications device for transmission of speech over radio)
 Satellite telephone

References

External links 
 Mobile Phone History
 Mobile Phone Generations
 Storno.co.uk
 Evolution of Mobile Wireless Technology from 0G to 5G

        
        
        
        

Radio telephone